In mathematics, Auerbach's lemma, named after Herman Auerbach, is a theorem in functional analysis which asserts that a certain property of Euclidean spaces holds for general finite-dimensional normed vector spaces.

Statement 
Let (V, ||·||) be an n-dimensional normed vector space. Then there exists a basis {e1, ..., en} of V such that
 ||ei|| = 1 and ||ei|| = 1 for i = 1, ..., n,
where {e1, ..., en} is a basis of V* dual to {e1, ..., en}, i. e. ei(ej) = δij. 

A basis with this property is called an Auerbach basis.

If V is an inner product space (or even infinite-dimensional Hilbert space) then this result is obvious as one may take for {ei} any orthonormal basis of V (the dual basis is then {(ei|·)}).

Geometric formulation 

An equivalent statement is the following: any centrally symmetric convex body in  has a linear image which contains the unit cross-polytope (the unit ball for the  norm) and is contained in the unit cube (the unit ball for the  norm).

Corollary 
The lemma has a corollary with implications to approximation theory. 

Let V be an n-dimensional subspace of a normed vector space (X, ||·||). Then there exists a projection P of X onto V such that ||P|| ≤ n.

Proof 
Let {e1, ..., en} be an Auerbach basis of V and {e1, ..., en} corresponding dual basis. By Hahn–Banach theorem each ei extends to f i ∈ X* such that 
 ||f i|| = 1.
Now set 
 P(x) = Σ f i(x) ei.
It's easy to check that P is indeed a projection onto V and that ||P|| ≤ n (this follows from triangle inequality).

References
Joseph Diestel, Hans Jarchow, Andrew Tonge, Absolutely Summing Operators, p. 146.
 Joram Lindenstrauss, Lior Tzafriri, Classical Banach Spaces I and II: Sequence Spaces; Function Spaces, Springer 1996, p. 16.
 Reinhold Meise, Dietmar Vogt, Einführung in die Funktionalanalysis, Vieweg, Braunschweig 1992, .
 Przemysław Wojtaszczyk, Banach spaces for analysts. Cambridge Studies in Advancod Mathematics, Cambridge University Press, vol. 25, 1991, p. 75.

Banach spaces
Lemmas in analysis